Randy  Diamond  is a Honduran footballer who plays as forward.

References

1987 births
Living people
People from Santa Bárbara Department, Honduras
Honduran footballers
Association football forwards
C.D. Real Juventud players
C.D. Marathón players
Zhejiang Professional F.C. players
Platense F.C. players
C.D. Malacateco players
C.D. Victoria players
Juticalpa F.C. players
CS Șoimii Pâncota players
Liga Nacional de Fútbol Profesional de Honduras players
Chinese Super League players
Liga II players
Honduran expatriate footballers
Expatriate footballers in China
Expatriate footballers in Guatemala
Expatriate footballers in Romania
Honduran expatriate sportspeople in Guatemala